Adaina propria is a moth in the family Pterophoridae. It is known from Mozambique.

References

Endemic fauna of Mozambique
Oidaematophorini
Lepidoptera of Mozambique
Moths of Sub-Saharan Africa
Moths described in 1921